The Laoshan Mountain Bike Course is a mountain bike cycling venue located in western Beijing, China adjacent to the Laoshan Velodrome. It began its renovation and expansion program in May 2006.

The course hosted the mountain bike competitions of the 2008 Summer Olympics.

The project involves a competition course of 4.6 kilometres in circumference, a fixed building with a floor space of 8,275 square metres, a temporary spectator stand that seats 2,000 and other temporary facilities for competitions.

The project was completed in the second half of 2007 and became a training base for the Chinese cycling team. It was also opened to the public after the 2008 Games.

References
Beijing2008.cn profile.

Venues of the 2008 Summer Olympics
Mountain biking venues
Olympic cycling venues
Sports venues in Beijing